Miss Africa Great Britain is a beauty pageant open to African women resident in the United Kingdom. The winner becomes a goodwill ambassador for Miss Africa Great Britain, charged with designing and implementing a charity program based on her Pageant Platform.

History 
The Miss Africa GB pageant was founded in 2011 by Dele Onabowu. The pageant was initially called Miss Black Africa UK and changed its name to Miss Africa Great Britain in December 2015. The pageant was formed with the sole purpose of giving young African girls born or living in the United Kingdom a platform to showcase not only their beauty but most importantly their culture, talent and creativity.

Title holders 

Leila Samati was crowned Miss Africa Great Britain 2018. She became Miss World Guinea Bissau 2019 and competed in the Miss World 2019 Finals on 14 December 2019.

Jacqueline Ilumoka was crowned Miss Africa Great Britain in October 2014. She was featured on BBC's The One Show.

She was also featured in Hello! in an article titled "Hello! Presents a Year of Love" in partnership with Swarovski.

Hall of fame

References 

Competitions in the United Kingdom
Beauty pageants in the United Kingdom